Duke Kang may refer to these ancient Chinese rulers:

Duke of Shao (died  1000 BC)
Duke Kang of Qin (died 609 BC)
Duke Kang of Qi (died 379 BC)

See also
King Kang (disambiguation)